In mathematics, the sum of two cubes is a cubed number added to another cubed number.

Factorization 
Every sum of cubes may be factored according to the identity

in elementary algebra.

Binomial numbers are the general of this factorization to higher odd powers.

Proof 
Starting with the expression,  is multiplied by a and b

And by cancelling the alike terms, we get

Fermat's last theorem 
Fermat's last theorem in the case of exponent 3 states that the sum of two non-zero integer cubes does not result in a non-zero integer cube. The first recorded proof of the exponent 3 case was given by Euler.

Taxicab and Cabtaxi numbers 
Taxicab numbers are numbers that can be expressed as a sum of two positive integer cubes in n distinct ways. The smallest taxicab number, after Ta(1), is 1729, expressed as
 or 

The smallest taxicab number expressed in 3 different ways is 87,539,319, expressed as
,  or 

Cabtaxi numbers are numbers that can be expressed as a sum of two positive or negative integers or 0 cubes in n ways. The smallest cabtaxi number, after Cabtaxi(1), is 91, expressed as:
 or 

The smallest Cabtaxi number expressed in 3 different ways is 4104, expressed as
,  or

See also 

 Difference of two squares
 Binomial number
 Sophie Germain's identity
 Aurifeuillean factorization

References

Further reading

Algebra